Tala is a town and a municipality in the state of Jalisco, Mexico. It is a small town that has grown over the years. Some major towns in the municipality are Tala (municipal seat), El Refugio, San Isidro Mazatepec, Cuisillos, and Ahuisculco.

History
"Tlallan", "Tala" or "Land of labor". It was a manor ruled by Pythaloc who had under his jurisdiction Ahuitzculco, Ocotán, Nextipac and Xocotán. It is believed that its foundation dates back to 1126. Nuño Beltrán de Guzmán conquered it in 1530 and was evangelized in 1531 by Fray Antonio de Segovia, Fray Juan de Badillo and Fray Andrés de Córdova. The peninsular found the ruins of Cués or shrines scattered in the Tala Valley. The aborigines did not submit easily to the conquerors and had two battles with them. Tala was compromised in the jurisdiction of the Kingdom of Nueva Galicia as a corregimiento. Its first ruler was Francisco Socorro Nuño de Guzmán who was the most combative aborigine, and Pedro Patiño de Guzmán was left in his place. In 1579 it was entrusted to Diego de Colio. Its inhabitants had a forest that they loved very much, being forced to cut it down when the Spaniards arrived. Out of sarcasm or contemptuously they began calling the town Talatitlán, degenerating into its current name. Throughout the colonial era, Tala retained its category of corregimiento. Since 1825 it belonged to the first Canton of Guadalajara and the department or party of Zapopan; and on that date Tala already had a town hall. On April 3, 1844 the town hall is established. Since 1847 it belonged to the 1st Canton of Guadalajara and the Department or Zapopan Party. In 1887 it has category of town. In 1995 Tala is elevated to the category of city. By 1890 the town of Tala included in its jurisdiction the following towns and farms: El Refugio, Cuisillos, Huaxtla, San Isidro, Ahuisculco, Santa Ana Tepetitlán and Navajas. In 1920 they are annexed to the municipality Cuxpala and San Isidro. By decree number 10211, published on January 10, 1980, it was decided that the population of Tala would rise to the category of city, having achieved higher rates of progress in the political, economic, cultural, social, demographic aspects; for its infrastructure works and in merit to the greatness and dignity of its inhabitants that are characterized by their civic, moral and intellectual qualities.

Tourism

Historical Monuments
Temple of San Francisco de Asís, Chapel of the Rosary, Treasury of the Orendaín Refuge.

Archeological zones
In the Tala Valley there are scattered archeological vestiges of what in the pre-Hispanic era were shrines or cués. In the region they are known as Guachimonton.

Parties 

The Caña Fair that takes place on the last days of April and the first of May. The Feasts of San Francisco de Asís that are celebrated from September 26 to October 4.

Music

Mariachi & Banda

Handicrafts

Handicrafts are made with obsidian and saddlery.

Traditional costumes

The charro suit and the dress of poblana china.

tronomy
Well and birria; piloncillo, dulce de leche and fruits in syrup; cane juice, punch and coffee with liquor, cane mezcal.

Touristic centres
The municipality has natural forests located in "La Primavera" Ahuisculco, Cerro de Las Garzas, Cerro Monte Negro, Las Navajas Hill and spas such as Los Tejabanes and El Rincón.

Government

Municipal presidents

References

Municipalities of Jalisco